Rasbora dorsinotata is a species of ray-finned fish in the genus Rasbora.

References 

Rasboras
Fish of Thailand
Taxa named by Maurice Kottelat
Fish described in 1988